A. tricolor  may refer to:

 Agelaius tricolor, the tricolored blackbird, a bird species found from Northern California in the United States to upper Baja California in Mexico
 Amaranthus tricolor, an ornamental plant species
 Atlapetes tricolor, the tricoloured brush-finch, a bird species found in Colombia, Ecuador, and Peru

Synonyms 

 Aganisia tricolor, a synonym for Aganisia cyanea, an orchid species

See also 

 Tricolor (disambiguation)